Leo II of Armenia may refer to:

 Leo II, Prince of Armenia
 Leo II, King of Armenia